Battlecorps is a video game developed by Core Design and published by Time Warner for the Sega CD in 1994.

Gameplay
Battlecorps involves a walking robot in a variety of terrain, armed with a large number of different weapons. Player characters include kickboxing specialist Becky Ojo, cyborg Dika "A" Jang, and special forces soldier Jack Cutter. The game is set in the year 2085 on the mining planet Mandelbrot's World.

Development
Battlecorps uses the same engine as AH-3 Thunderstrike.

Reception
Next Generation reviewed the game, rating it three stars out of five. The reviewer called it a "Big mistake" to trade the flying machines of Thunderstrike for the walking robot, as "the net effect is the slowing down of action". He did find that the game offered "a relatively exciting challenge" but criticized the "bitmaps that look fine if you fly by them look blocky walking up to them" and quipped that "we'll keep waiting for Thunderstrike II."

The game was reviewed in French magazine Supersonic #23 (Jul, 1994), which gave the game a rating of 94%, saying that Core Design knows how to make good games for the Mega CD.

The game was reviewed in French magazine Consoles Plus (Jul, 1994), which gave the game a rating of 89% and found that its visuals were innovative, but that the game becomes repetitive over time.

Martin Hughes reviewed Battlecorps for the website Sega-16.com (Aug 01, 2011) and stated that "Whether you want to see the game though, or just blow up some stuff, Battlecorps caters for all."

Previews
 GameFan #15 (Vol 2, Issue 3) February 1994
 Mega, Future Publishing, issue 23, page 50, August 1994

Reviews
 Edge #11
 GamePro (Aug, 1994)
 Electronic Gaming Monthly (Sep, 1994)
 Mean Machines - Aug, 1994
 Game Players - Oct, 1994
 Video Games & Computer Entertainment - Nov, 1994

References

1994 video games
Core Design games
Sega CD games
Sega CD-only games
Video games about mecha
Video games developed in the United Kingdom